Divide Pictures is an American film and television entertainment production company established in 2003, which is owned and operated by actor Milo Ventimiglia and his best friend Russ Cundiff, who formerly used to work for the William Morris Agency.

History

The WB image campaigns
According to various sources, Ventimiglia (fresh off the success of having co-starred on the network's series Gilmore Girls) was hired as a second unit director on two marketing campaigns in 2003 and 2004 for The WB Television Network (which today is now part of The CW Television Network).

Both of the campaigns that Ventimiglia worked on can be viewed on YouTube.

YouTube content
Sometime in 2007, DIVIDE came to prominence in the YouTube community after  Ventimiglia himself began appearing in several videos, often placing Ventimiglia in short video clips taking part in some seemingly random activity such as shining his shoes or brushing his teeth.

Like The WB's campaigns, whether or not these videos can be considered authentic material produced by Divide Pictures is unclear, though Cundiff's YouTube profile displays links to Divide's official website and many other claims to his affiliation with the company, in addition to several claims that he or Ventimiglia came up with the "ideas" for particular videos, suggesting that they were produced by the two rather than thoughtlessly shot without a creative process backing it.

American Eagle Outfitters
In May 2007, it was announced in several media outlets that Divide Pictures was officially collaborating with the popular American Eagle Outfitters to direct and produce an original web-series tentatively titled It's a Mall World. The series will consist of 12 5-minute "webisodes" that will air every week starting August 2 on American Eagle's official website and in American Eagle stores, as well as during commercials breaks during the new season of MTV's popular reality series The Real World.

According to the press release about the project, It's a Mall World will explore the lives and relationships of two record store employees, an "object of perfection" greeter at the American Eagle store across the way, as well as a slightly psychotic girl who works in a lingerie store, and a bad-boy poseur from the requisite mall juice bar. The cast includes many up-and-coming young actors such as Sam Huntington, Dianna Agron, Amanda Loncar, Deon Richmond and Eddie Hargitay and is being written by Adam Green.

After It's a Mall World, Dianna Agron has signed to go on in a recurring role on the television series Heroes, the hit show Ventimiglia also stars on.

According to author John Rosengren's website Divide Pictures, the production company of actor Milo Ventimiglia (Rocky, jr.) and Jefferson alumnus Russ Cundiff, recently optioned the movie and television rights to John’s book on high school hockey in Minnesota “Blades of Glory: The True Story of a Young Team Bred to Win”.

Behind the camera Ventimiglia and his partner at Divide Pictures Russ Cundiff are involved in traditional content having sold TV shows to NBC, SyFy and FX, and producing the independent feature TELL which Ventimiglia co-starred alongside of Jason Lee and Katee Sackhoff as well as STATIC, which Ventimiglia co-starred with Sarah Shahi and Sara Paxton. Ventimiglia also produced the web-series Chosen, now in its second season for Sony's Crackle as well as directed other digital projects for American Eagle Outfitters, Cadillac, GQ and Liberty Mutual. Divide Pictures' latest web-series "The P.E.T. Squad" Files for CW's Seed, is about a group of amateur ghost hunters who chase fame without having seen an actual apparition. The show launches summer 2013 from San Diego Comicon. Ventimiglia's passion for comic books led him to produce two titles for Top Cow / Image Comics "Rest" and "Berserker"

External links
 Divide Pictures

Film production companies of the United States
Television production companies of the United States
Entertainment companies established in 2003